The Golgi tendon organ (GTO) (also called Golgi organ, tendon organ, neurotendinous organ or neurotendinous spindle) is a proprioceptor – a type of sensory receptor that senses changes in muscle tension. It lies at the interface between a muscle and its tendon known as the musculotendinous junction also known as the myotendinous junction. It provides the sensory component of the Golgi tendon reflex.

The Golgi tendon organ is one of several eponymous terms named after the Italian physician Camillo Golgi.

Structure
The body of the Golgi tendon organ is made up of braided strands of collagen (intrafusal fasciculi) that are less compact than elsewhere in the tendon and are encapsulated.
The capsule is connected in series (along a single path) with a group of muscle fibers at one end, and merge into the tendon proper at the other.
Inside the capsule, the afferent fibers lose their medullary sheaths, branch, intertwine with the collagen fibers, and terminate as flattened leaf-like endings between the collagen strands (see figure).

Function 

When the muscle generates force, the sensory terminals are compressed. This stretching deforms the terminals of the Ib afferent axon, opening stretch-sensitive cation channels. As a result, the Ib axon is depolarized and fires nerve impulses that are propagated to the spinal cord. The action potential frequency signals the force being developed by 10-20 extrafusal muscle fibers in the muscle. Average level of activity in a tendon organ population is representative of the whole muscle force.

The Ib sensory feedback generates stretch reflexes and supraspinal responses which control muscle contraction. Ib afferents synapse with interneurons in the spinal cord that also project to the brain cerebellum and cerebral cortex. The Golgi tendon reflex assists in regulating muscle contraction force. It is associated with the Ib. Tendon organs signal muscle force through the entire physiological range, not only at high strain.

During locomotion, Ib input excites rather than inhibits motoneurons of the receptor-bearing muscles, and it affects the timing of the transitions between the stance and swing phases of locomotion. The switch to autogenic excitation is a form of positive feedback.

The ascending or afferent pathways to the cerebellum are the dorsal and ventral spinocerebellar tracts. They are involved in the cerebellar regulation of movement.

History 

Until 1967 it was believed that Golgi tendon organs had a high threshold, only becoming active at high muscle forces. Consequently, it was thought that tendon organ input caused "weightlifting failure" through the clasp-knife reflex, which protected the muscle and tendons from excessive force.  However, the underlying premise was shown to be incorrect by James Houk and Elwood Henneman in 1967.

See also 

 Golgi–Mazzoni corpuscles

Footnotes

Sources

Other sources

External links

Somatosensory system
Neurophysiology
Nervous tissue cells
Proprioception